Tomás Silva  (born February 2, 1966) is an ex-Uruguayan football former player.

He played in 2 championship winning teams for Universitario de Deportes in 1992 and 1993

References

Sportspeople from Lima
1966 births
Living people
Uruguayan footballers
Club Nacional de Football players
Club Universitario de Deportes footballers
Expatriate footballers in Peru

Association football midfielders